Events from the year 1668 in Ireland.

Incumbent
Monarch: Charles II

Events
 Roger Boyle, Earl of Orrery, resigns the office of Lord President of Munster on account of disputes with James Butler, Duke of Ormonde, Lord Lieutenant of Ireland.

Births
 Thomas FitzMaurice, 1st Earl of Kerry, politician (d. 1741)

Deaths
 14 April – George Hamilton, 4th Baron Hamilton of Strabane (b. c.1636/7)
 Full date unknown – Patrick D'Arcy, nationalist who wrote the constitution of Confederate Ireland (b. 1598)

References

 
1660s in Ireland
Ireland
Years of the 17th century in Ireland